The men's sprint K-2 (kayak double) 1000 metres competition at the 2018 Asian Games was held from 29 to 30 August 2018.

Schedule
All times are Western Indonesia Time (UTC+07:00)

Results

Heats 
 Qualification: 1–3 → Final (QF), Rest → Semifinal (QS)

Heat 1

Heat 2

Semifinal 
 Qualification: 1–3 → Final (QF)

Final

References

External links 
Official website

Men's K-2 1000 metres